Robert William "Bob" Runciman  (born August 10, 1942) is a Canadian politician and former provincial Leader of the Opposition in the Ontario Legislature. First elected to the Legislative Assembly of Ontario in 1981, he held the seat continuously for Progressive Conservative Party of Ontario for the next 29 years. On January 29, 2010, he was appointed to the Senate of Canada as a Conservative, where he served until August 10, 2017.

Early career
Before going to Queen's Park, Runciman owned a local weekly newspaper, and sat as a municipal councillor in Brockville from 1972 to 1981. He also worked in production management in the chemical industry.

Provincial politics
He was elected to the Legislative Assembly of Ontario in the 1981 provincial election as a Progressive Conservative Member of Provincial Parliament (MPP) for Leeds in eastern Ontario. He was returned in each subsequent provincial election, and later represented the riding of Leeds—Grenville.

Miller cabinet
Runciman served as Minister of Government Services from February 8 to May 17, 1985,  and as Minister of Consumer Relations from May 17 to June 26, 1985, in the short-lived cabinet of Ontario Premier Frank Miller.

Opposition
With the defeat of Miller's government on a vote of confidence, Runciman joined his party on the opposition benches. He was nearly defeated by Liberal Jim Jordan in the 1987 election, winning by only 198 votes. On all other occasions, he has been re-elected without difficulty.  Despite being on the right-wing of the party, Runciman endorsed Red Tory Larry Grossman for the party leadership in November 1985.

Harris and Eves cabinet
When the Tories returned to power in the 1995 election, Runciman became Solicitor General and Minister of Correctional Services in the government of Mike Harris, holding the position from June 26, 1995, to June 17, 1999. During this period, he championed privately owned prisons, and was criticized on one occasion for revealing the name of a young offender in the legislature. On June 17, 1999, he was moved to the portfolio of Minister of Consumer and Commercial Relations, and on February 8, 2001, was named Minister of Economic Development and Trade.

Runciman supported Ernie Eves's successful bid to succeed Harris as leader of the Progressive Conservative Party in 2002. On April 15, 2002, Eves re-appointed Runciman to the position of Minister of Public Safety and Security (as the position of Solicitor General became known in the period following the September 11 attacks).

On August 6, 2003, Runciman made controversial comments in the wake of tensions between Toronto's black community and the city's police. "I think some people make a living off this," Runciman said. "People who don't accept any degree of responsibility to solve the challenges and misunderstandings." After confirming that he was referring to members of the black community, he went on to say that "some folks here appear to have, in my view, a vested interest in seeing this kind of tension continue to exist." His comments were later condemned by the Canadian Race Relations foundation and several other opposition MPP's.

Return to opposition
Runciman returned to the opposition benches with the defeat of the Eves government in the 2003 election. He supported John Tory in the leadership election to succeed Eves. Tory won the contest, and, not having a seat in the legislature, named Runciman to the position of interim Leader of the Opposition in September 2004.

Although Runciman holds strongly conservative views on matters such as criminal justice, he was not regarded as one of the more ideological members of his caucus. In recent years, he has played a significant role in his party's leadership transitions.

Runciman resumed the position of opposition leader following the 2007 provincial election in which John Tory failed to win a seat in  the Legislature, losing to Liberal Minister Kathleen Wynne.  Tory stayed on as Party Leader until March 2009 when he lost a subsequent bid to get elected in a by-election and resigned.  Following Tory's resignation as Party Leader in March 2009, members of the PC Caucus selected Runciman as interim Party Leader until Tim Hudak was elected to the position in June 2009.

|-

Federal politics
Runciman supported Tom Long's bid to lead the Canadian Alliance in 2000. When Long was dropped from the contest after the first ballot, he turned his support to Stockwell Day, the eventual winner.

In the 2004 federal Conservative leadership campaign, Runciman was an early supporter of eventual winner Stephen Harper.

On May 17, 2005, Runciman was chastised for remarks he made about federal member of Parliament Belinda Stronach's decision to cross the floor from the Conservative Party of Canada to the Liberal Party of Canada. Runciman said, "She sort of defined herself as something of a dipstick, an attractive one, but still a dipstick."

Runciman was appointed to the Canadian Senate on the recommendation of Prime Minister Harper on January 29, 2010. He is seen as an ally of Harper in advocating of Senate reform and a "law and order" agenda.  He served in the Senate until reaching the mandatory retirement age on August 10, 2017.

References

Notes

Citations

External links
 
 

1942 births
21st-century Canadian politicians
Attorneys General of Ontario
Canadian Presbyterians
Canadian senators from Ontario
Conservative Party of Canada senators
Leaders of the Progressive Conservative Party of Ontario
Living people
People from Brockville
Progressive Conservative Party of Ontario MPPs